This is the results breakdown of the local elections held in Catalonia on 13 June 1999. The following tables show detailed results in the autonomous community's most populous municipalities, sorted alphabetically.

Overall

City control
The following table lists party control in the most populous municipalities, including provincial capitals (shown in bold). Gains for a party are displayed with the cell's background shaded in that party's colour.

Municipalities

Badalona
Population: 209,606

Barcelona

Population: 1,505,581

Cornellà de Llobregat
Population: 80,329

Girona
Population: 71,858

L'Hospitalet de Llobregat
Population: 248,521

Lleida
Population: 112,207

Mataró
Population: 103,265

Reus
Population: 89,034

Sabadell
Population: 184,859

Sant Cugat del Vallès
Population: 50,529

Santa Coloma de Gramenet
Population: 120,958

Tarragona
Population: 112,795

Terrassa
Population: 165,654

References

Catalonia
1999